Attorney General Galbraith may refer to:

John B. Galbraith (1828–1869), Attorney General of Florida
W. J. Galbraith (1883–1956), Attorney General of Arizona